Ladenbergia rubiginosa is a species of plant in the family Rubiaceae. It is endemic to Ecuador.

References

Flora of Ecuador
rubiginosa
Critically endangered plants
Taxonomy articles created by Polbot